Echinacea angustifolia, the narrow-leaved purple coneflower or blacksamson echinacea, is a species of flowering plant in the family Asteraceae. It is native to North America, where it is widespread across much of the Great Plains of central Canada and the central United States, with additional populations in surrounding regions.

E. angustifolia is a perennial herb with spindle-shaped taproots that are often branched. The stems and leaves are moderately to densely hairy. The plant produces one flower heads one branch - each at the end of a long peduncle. Each flower head contains 8–21 pink or purple ray florets plus 80–250 orange disc florets.

Echinacea angustifolia blooms in late spring to mid-summer. It is found growing in dry prairies and barrens with rocky to sandy-clay soils. There are two subspecies:

Echinacea angustifolia subsp. angustifolia is native to central Canada and the central United States from Saskatchewan and Manitoba in the north to Arizona, New Mexico, Texas, and Louisiana in the south.
Echinacea angustifolia subsp. strigosa has a more limited range in Kansas, Oklahoma, Texas, and Louisiana.

Many Native American groups used this plant for traditional medicine, although there is mixed consensus that it is effective or safe for treating disease.

Morphology 
The word "Echinacea" is derived from the Greek word "echinos" which means sea urchin or hedgehog; a feature that can be observed in the flower head of the plant. 

Echinacea angustifolia is about 10-50 cm in length. 

The plant consists of white to pink or deep purple flower petals that characteristically wilt downwards, while the ray florets of the flower head range from green to red-brown in color. The leaves are dark green and can be oblong-lanceolate or elliptical in shape. The plant has pubescent stems with rhizomes present underground.

Reproduction and life cycle 
The plant does not self pollinate and requires assistance from bee pollinators in the reproduction process. In Echinacea angustifolia there is greater success in pollination between mates that are at a closer proximity between one another. Echinacea angustifolia is an herbaceous perennial plant, producing flowers and living more than two years at a time. The plant is known to grow at a slow rate and is drought-resistant to help the plant survive in its temperate grassland habitat.

Chemistry 

Greater root density is observed in Echinacea angustifolia growing in higher latitude, in turn, producing a greater quantity of polyphenols and alkylamides available in the root extract.

References 

angustifolia
Plants used in traditional Native American medicine
Garden plants of North America
Drought-tolerant plants
Flora of North America